Wevill is a surname. Notable people with the surname include:

Assia Wevill (1927–1969), German socialite 
David Wevill (born 1935), Japanese-born Canadian poet and translator